"Pow! (Forward)" is the debut single by English grime artist Lethal Bizzle. The track features guest appearances from a variety of underground grime artists. It was released on 25 October 2004 for digital download via iTunes and then released on 20 December 2004. It charted on 26 December 2004 at number 11 on the UK Singles Chart and currently stands as Bizzle's joint highest-charting solo single, along with "Rari WorkOut" and "Fester Skank".

Background 
"Pow! (Forward)", also known as "Forward Riddim", features other grime artists such as Fumin, D Double E, Napper, Jamakabi, Neeko, Flowdan, Ozzie B, MC Forcer and Demon. It was banned from airplay on some radio stations due to some controversial lyrics about gun culture. Even with little promotion, it still managed to reach number 11 in the UK top 40 in early 2005. It has also been banned from many clubs as it tended to provoke fights. A documentary called Pow Pow about the song was released in 2005.

Sequels

"Forward Riddim 2" 
Lethal Bizzle released "Forward Riddim 2" in 2006 with his new crew, Fire Camp. An interpolation of "Pow! (Forward)", which featured eleven grime artists, included Flirta D and Kano.

"Forward 2" 
Fire Camp has another sequel to "Pow! (Forward)", called "Forward 2".

"Pow 2011" 

In late 2010, Lethal Bizzle created an official sequel single to "Pow! (Forward)", which again features other grime MCs - JME, Wiley, Chipmunk, Face, P Money, Ghetts and Kano. It was released on 6 February 2011 for digital download. Bizzle revealed that he was joking about doing a sequel to "Pow" at first, but then many fans on Twitter and artists such as Wiley, Chipmunk and JME agreed with doing a sequel.

Music videos 
"Pow! (Forward)" has two videos; one for Channel U, a popular UK hip-hop music channel, and one for MTV Base, a more well known channel which shows (mostly U.S.) hip-hop music. They are both available on YouTube. The original video was uploaded onto EMI's official YouTube channel in February 2009.

Track listing 
CD RELDX15
"Pow! (Forward)" (Original) – 3:01
"Pow! (Forward)" (Da Bizzle Remix) – 2:49
"Pow! (Forward)" (D Hector Movie Mix) – 4:02
"Pow! (Forward)" (Relentless Video) – 3:42
"Pow! (Forward)" (Original Video) – 3:45

12" RELT 15
A1. "Pow! (Forward)" (Pow Edit) – 3:00
A2. "Pow! (Forward)" (Original) – 3:01
A3. "Pow! (Forward)" (Original Instrumental) – 3:29
B1. "Pow! (Forward)" (Da Bizzle Remix) – 2:49
B2. "Pow! (Forward)" (D Hector Movie Mix) – 4:02

12" RELTX 15
A1. "Pow! (Forward)" (Pow Edit) – 3:00
A2. "Pow! (Forward)" (Original) – 3:01
B1. "Pow! (Forward)" (Original Instrumental) – 3:29
B2. "Pow! (Forward)" (Da Bizzle Remix) – 2:49

12" RELTDJ 15
A. "Pow! (Forward)" (Original)
B1. "Pow! (Forward)" (D Hector Movie Mix)
B2. "Pow! (Forward)" (Original Instrumental)

Chart performance 
The song first charted on the UK Singles Chart on 1 January 2005 at number 11, being Lethal Bizzle's highest-charting single to date. The following week it dropped to number 14, then number 23. The week after, on 22 January 2005, it slipped to 37, and by 29 January 2005 it came just out of the top 40 at 41 and then remained in the top 100 for another two weeks - achieving a total of seven weeks on the UK Singles Chart. The record would be matched nine years later when his single "Rari WorkOut" also peaked at number 11, but the record would be broken if streaming had not been incorporated into the charts as "Rari WorkOut" peaked at number 8 on sales alone.

Charts

References 

2004 songs
2004 debut singles
Lethal Bizzle songs
Relentless Records singles
Songs written by Lethal Bizzle